The púca (Irish for spirit/ghost; plural púcaí), puca (Old English for goblin; plural pucel) pwca, pooka, phouka, puck is a creature of Celtic, English, and Channel Islands folklore. Considered to be bringers both of good and bad fortune, they could help or hinder rural and marine communities. Púcaí can have dark or white fur or hair. The creatures were said to be shape-changers, which could take the appearance of horses, goats, cats, dogs, and hares. They may also take a human form, which includes various animal features, such as ears or a tail.

Etymology and analogues
The origin of the name is unknown, with some theorising that it originated in Germanic language before being introduced to Celtic culture, and others believing the opposite. The earliest attestation of the word is in the Old English language, where it appears to have been in use as early as the 8th century, based on place name evidence. Since it is a 'cultural' rather than a practical word that might be used in trading, it is thought to reflect greater cultural contact between Celtic and Germanic cultures in the early medieval period than had been thought.

The púca has counterparts throughout the Celtic and Germanic cultures of Northwest Europe. For instance, in Scandinavian languages we find, according to the OED, "Old Icelandic púki mischievous demon, the Devil, Faroese púki, Norwegian (originally and chiefly regional) puke devil, evil spirit, mischievous person, Old Swedish puke devil, evil spirit, Swedish (now chiefly regional) puke evil spirit, devil, goblin), Old Danish puge evil spirit". In Welsh mythology it is named the pwca and in Cornish the Bucca (thus being related in etymology and milieu to the bugaboo). In the Channel Islands, the pouque were said to be fairies who lived near ancient stones; in Norman French of the Islands (e.g. Jèrriais), a cromlech, or prehistoric tomb, is referred to as a pouquelée or pouquelay(e); poulpiquet and polpegan are corresponding terms in Brittany.

Nature of the púca 
The púca may be regarded as being either menacing or beneficial. Fairy mythologist Thomas Keightley said "notions respecting it are very vague", and in a brief description gives an account collected by Croker from a boy living near Killarney that "old people used to say that the Pookas were very numerous ... long ago ... , were wicked-minded, black-looking, bad things ... that would come in the form of wild colts, with chains hanging about them", and that did much to harm unwary travellers. Also, little bad boys and girls were warned not to eat overripe blackberries, because this was a sign that the pooka has entered them.

One theme of the púca's folklore is their proclivity for mischief. They are commonly said to entice humans to take a ride on their back, giving the rider a wild and terrifying journey before dropping the unlucky person back at the place they were taken from. This lore bears similarities to other Irish folk creatures, such as the daoine maithe (good people) or the slua si (fairy host), said to target humans on the road or along their regular "passes". These human encounters of the púca tend to occur in rural, isolated places, far from settlements or homes.

While púca stories can be found across northern Europe, Irish tales specify a protective measure for encountering a púca. It is said that the rider may be able to take control of the púca by wearing sharp spurs, using those to prevent being taken or to steer the creature if already on its back.

A translation of an Irish púca story, "An Buachaill Bó agus an Púca", told by storyteller Seán Ó Cróinín, describes this method of control of the púca as done by a young boy who had been the creature's target once before:

... the farmer asked the lad what had kept him out so late. The lad told him.

"I have spurs," said the farmer. "Put them on you tonight and if he brings you give him the spurs!" And this the lad did. The thing threw him from its back and the lad got back early enough. Within a week the (pooka) was before him again after housing the cows.

"Come to me," said the lad, "so I can get up on your back."

"Have you the sharp things on?" said the animal.

"Certainly," said the lad.

"Oh I won't go near you, then," he said.

The protective power of the "sharp things", as they are always referred to by the pooka in the tales, may stem from the Irish belief that "cold iron" has the ability to ward off the supernatural.

In contrast, the púca is represented as being helpful to farmers by Lady Wilde, who relates the following tale. A farmer's son named Padraig one day noticed the invisible presence of the púca brushing by, and called out to him, offering a coat. The púca appeared in the guise of a young bull, and told him to come to the old mill at night. From that time onward, the púca came secretly at night and performed all the work of milling the sacks of corn into flour. Padraig fell asleep the first time, but later concealed himself in a chest to catch sight of them, and later made a present of a fine silk suit. This unexpectedly caused the púca to go off to "see a little of the world" and cease its work. But by then the farmer's wealth allowed him to retire and give his son an education. Later, at Padraig's wedding, the púca left a gift of a golden cup filled with drink that evidently ensured their happiness.

Another example of the púca as a benevolent or protective entity comes in tales where the creature intervenes before a terrible accident or before the person is about to happen upon a malevolent fairy or spirit. In several of the regional variants of the stories where the púca is acting as a guardian, the púca identifies itself to the bewildered human. This is particularly noteworthy as it is in contrast to the lore of many other folkloric beings, who guard their identities or names from humans.

There are stories of some púcaí being blood-thirsty and vampire-like creatures. Other stories even say some are man-eating beings, hunting down, killing, and eating their victims.

Morphology and physiology
According to legend, the púca is a deft shapeshifter, capable of assuming a variety of terrifying or pleasing forms. It can take a human form, but will often have animal features, such as ears or a tail. As an animal, the púca will most commonly appear as a horse, cat, rabbit, raven, fox, wolf, goat, goblin, or dog. No matter what shape the púca takes, its fur is almost always dark. It most commonly takes the form of a sleek black horse with a flowing mane and luminescent golden eyes. (The Manx glashtyn also takes on human form, but he usually betrays his horse's ears and is analogous to the each uisce.)

If a human is enticed onto a púca's back, it has been known to give them a wild ride; however, unlike a kelpie, which will take its rider and dive into the nearest stream or lake to drown and devour them, the púca will do its rider no real harm. However, according to some folklorists, the only man ever to ride the púca was Brian Boru, High King of Ireland, by using a special bridle incorporating three hairs of the púca's tail. The púca has the power of human speech, and has been known to give advice and lead people away from harm. Though the púca enjoys confusing and often terrifying humans, it is considered to be benevolent.

Agricultural traditions
Certain agricultural traditions surround the púca. It is a creature associated with Samhain, a Goidelic harvest festival, when the last of the crops are brought in. Anything remaining in the fields is considered "puka", or fairy-blasted, and hence inedible. In some locales, reapers leave a small share of the crop, the "púca's share", to placate the hungry creature. Nonetheless, 1 November is the púca's day, and the one day of the year when it can be expected to behave civilly.

At the beginning of November, the púca was known—in some locales—to either defecate or spit on the wild fruits rendering them inedible and unsafe thenceforth.

Regional variations
In some regions, the púca is spoken of with considerably more respect than fear; if treated with deference, it may actually be beneficial to those who encounter it. The púca is a creature of the mountains and hills, and in those regions there are stories of it appearing on November Day and providing prophecies and warnings to those who consult it.

In some parts of County Down, the púca is manifested as a short, disfigured goblin who demands a share of the harvest; in County Laois, it appears as a monstrous bogeyman, while in Waterford and Wexford the púca appears as an eagle with a huge wingspan and in Roscommon as a black goat.

Art and popular culture

Literature and film

Shakespeare's 1595 play A Midsummer Night's Dream features the character "Robin Goodfellow," who is also called "sweet Puck," a version of the púca. 

In Sheridan Le Fanu's 1861 novel Ultor De Lacey:  A Legend of Cappercullen, the children encounter a Phooka's tower. The title character in his short story "The White Cat of Drumgunniol" (1870) is a phooka in the shape of a cat.

One of the primary characters of Flann O'Brien's 1939 debut novel At Swim-Two-Birds is the Pooka MacPhellimey, who can change his appearance by smoking from a magic pipe.

The title character in the 1944 stage play Harvey, later adapted into a 1950 film starring James Stewart, is a six-foot, three-and-a-half-inch (1.92 m) tall rabbit, who is referred to as a "pooka".

A pooka appears in the 1959 Disney film Darby O'Gill and the Little People, in the form of a horse, looking ordinary at first, but revealing its true colors quite literally by its hide changing colors. It knocks the title character Darby down a well into a cavern full of leprechauns within the hill Knocknasheega, and later leads his daughter Katie up the same hill, causing her to become mortally wounded when she falls from a cliff.

Piers Anthony's novel Crewel Lye: A Caustic Yarn (1984) features Pook the Pooka, a ghost horse with chains, as the mount of Jordan the Barbarian. Pook's daughter Peek shows up in subsequent books.

The Grey Horse (1987) by R. A. MacAvoy, an Irish fantasy set in the time of Parnell, features a púca the form of a Connemara pony.

In War for the Oaks (1987), an urban fantasy novel by Emma Bull, a phouka protects the human main character in a war between the faerie folk. He is depicted as a mischievous trickster character who can take the shape of a dog and a man.

Pookas appear in children's television programme Knightmare (1987–1994). They are presented as a threat, either malevolent or mindless, and appear as floating green entities with swivelling eyes and prominent cheeks. These pookas have plants growing from their head and generally appear in wild areas such as woodland or overgrown ruins.

In Peter S. Beagle's novel Tamsin (1999), the pooka appears as an untamed, untrustworthy being who deigns to assist the protagonist Jenny. As in folklore, this pooka is a shapeshifter who most often appears as a wild pony. In all his forms he is black with golden eyes.

In the Merry Gentry book series (2000–present) by Laurell K. Hamilton, one of the main characters, Doyle, owes part of his heritage to the phouka.

In The Spiderwick Chronicles (2003–2009), a children's fantasy book series by Tony DiTerlizzi and Holly Black, a phooka is among the many faeries and fantastical creatures encountered by the Grace children. It is portrayed as a bizarre but harmless creature which talks in riddles and behaves in a similar manner to the Cheshire Cat from Alice's Adventures in Wonderland.

Music
Pooka (1992–2002) was the former songwriting duo of the British guitarists/vocalists Sharon Lewis and Natasha Jones. They took their name from the púca, a mythical Irish goblin with an uneven temper.

Comics, manga and anime
In the manga Berserk (1989–present) the fairy accompanying the main character is named "Puck". It is later revealed that he is a spirit of nature.

In the anime series Sword Art Online (2002–2008), pooka is one of the nine races that ALfheim Online's players are divided into.

In the manga and anime series Re:Zero - Starting Life in Another World, "Puck" is a summoned spirit companion of Emilia. They take the appearance of a grey and white cat but seems to shapeshift and have immense power when they want to use it. 

In the American comic book series Blue Monday (1998–present), a pooka in the form of a large river otter named Seamus is the friend of the protagonist, Bleu Finnegan, living in Central California in the early 1990s. He is mostly there to cause mischief, but he is also suspected of being her protector. He is only visible to her and one other character, a recently-immigrated Irish teenager and best friend of Bleu named Clover Connelly, who refuses to acknowledge him in public.

Tabletop and video games
In the video game Dig Dug (1982) the most common enemy is named after the Pooka.

In the White Wolf Publishing tabletop role playing game Changeling: The Dreaming (1995), Pooka are one of the standard kiths, or option for playable character types, among several other creatures of Celtic and Gaelic folklore.

Phooka appears in the digital card game Cabals: Magic & Battle Cards (2011).

In the video game The Witcher 3: Wild Hunt (2015), Phoocas are described as stronger versions of the in-game monsters, called Nekkers.

In the video game Assassin's Creed Valhalla (2020) in the Wrath of the Druids expansion, púca are portrayed as a type of werewolf with antlers.

In the video game Etrian Odyssey IV (2012), Pucas or "Pooca" would appear occasionally and would grant players bonuses and extra stat points for slaying them.

In the card game Dominion (2008), Pooka is a card that allows the player to sacrifice a treasure to draw 4 cards.

In the video game Odin Sphere (2007), Pookas are rabbit-like humanoid creatures who often serve as servants to humans, but have their own society and goals as well.

Television
The December episode of the series Into the Dark is titled "Pooka!" (2018) and centers around the main character being taken on a terrifying psychological journey.

In the 2018 television series Britannia, "Pwykka" is a demon of the Celtic underworld, taking the form of a serpent.

In the Legends of Tomorrow episode "Nip/Stuck" (2019), John Constantine saves an adolescent Púca from his ancestor in 55 BCE.

In The Adventures of the Leafeans (2020), a children's fantasy animated television series by Char Whaley, a phooka is among the many faeries and fantastical creatures encountered by the Merkles. It is portrayed as a bizarre, mischievous, but harmless anthro lynx/hyena-like creature which talks in riddles sometimes and behaves in a similar manner to the Scarecrow from The Wonderful Wizard of Oz and Cheshire Cat from Alice in Wonderland and was voiced by Robert Carlyle.

Sports
The hurling club in Pittsburgh, United States is known as the Pittsburgh Púcas.

See also

General
Oni
Torngarsuk
Yaoguai
Yekyua
Puck (mythology)
Aderyn y corph

Popular culture
Welsh mythology
English mythology
Harvey (1944 play)
Harvey (1950 film)

Footnotes

References

Bibliography
Erin Sebo (2017) Does OE Puca Have an Irish Origin?, Studia Neophilologica, 89:2, 167-175.
Katharine Briggs, An Encyclopedia of Fairies, Hobgoblins, Brownies, Boogies, and Other Supernatural Creatures, "Pwca", p 337. .
Mary Chase, Harvey (Harvey the Pooka)
Thomas Liehr: Pukas: About the next relatives of the ‘big white rabbit’ known from “Harvey”. In English and German 

, p. 371
 "Chapter: Fairy Help (The Phouka)", p. 48 (Boston, Ticknor, 1888)
 "Mystical Mythology from around the World." Mystical Mythology from around the World. N.p., n.d. Web. 28 Dec. 2014.

Aos Sí
Fairies
Fantasy creatures
Irish folklore
English folklore
English mythology
English legendary creatures
Germanic mythology
Irish legendary creatures
Scottish mythology
Therianthropy
Tuatha Dé Danann
Welsh mythology
Welsh legendary creatures
Cornish legendary creatures